Dan Kassawa FC is a Nigerien football club based in Maradi, Niger. The club was formed in 2008 and plays in Niger Premier League.

Stadium
The team currently plays at Stade de Maradi, which holds 10,000 people.

Performance in CAF competitions
2011 WAFU Club Championship: 1 appearance

References

External links
 Soccerway
 Logo

Football clubs in Niger
Maradi, Niger
Super Ligue (Niger) clubs